The Strand (also known as Strand Hotel) is a Victorian-style hotel located in Yangon, Myanmar (Burma), built by Aviet and Tigran Sarkie, two of the Sarkies Brothers. The hotel, which opened in 1901, which faces the Yangon River to its south, is one of the most famous hotels in Yangon and Southeast Asia, and is managed by GCP Hospitality. The hotel is named after its address, at 92 Strand Road.

History

The Strand opened in 1901. It was built by the British entrepreneur John Darwood but later acquired by the Sarkies brothers, who owned a number of luxury hotels in the Far East, including the Raffles Hotel in Singapore and the Eastern & Oriental Hotel in Penang, Malaysia. During the colonial period, The Strand was one of the most luxurious hotels in the British Empire with a clientele of exclusively whites. The Sarkies brothers sold The Strand to Rangoon restaurateur Peter Bugalar Aratoon and Ae Amovsie in 1925. The hotel underwent a major renovation in 1937 and then in 1941, during World War II, following Japanese occupation of Burma, the hotel was used briefly to quarter Japanese troops. The following year, the Strand's ownership was transferred to the Imperial Hotel in Tokyo. For the first time in 1945, since The Strand's establishment, the Burmese became part of the hotel's clientele. After Burma achieved independence in 1948, the hotel was neglected by post-colonial governments. In 1963, The Strand Hotel was bought by the Burma Economic Development Corporation, which poorly maintained it. After the 1988 coup d'état, The Strand was sold in 1989 to Bernard Pe-Win, a Burmese businessman, who formed an alliance with Adrian Zecha and a group of investors who formed The Strand Hotel International.

Following a total renovation, The Strand reopened in 1993 as an all-suite, top-of-the range boutique hotel. Its teak and marble floors, mahogany furniture, and canopied beds complement original pieces, like period bathroom fixtures.  A swimming pool was added to the hotel in 2017 along with gym facilities, and it is now managed and operated by GCP Hospitality.

The hotel is listed on the Yangon City Heritage List. Since the beginning, it was regarded as “the finest hostelry east of the Suez” and “patronised by royalty, nobility, and distinguished personages". 
In 1993, the hotel was for the first time listed among the Select Members of The Most Famous Hotels in the World.
In 2003, Andreas Augustin published the first history of the hotel, after years of extensive research.

See also
 Eastern & Oriental Hotel and Raffles Hotel, other hotels established by the Sarkies Brothers.

Notes

Literature

References

External links

 The Strand Homepage

 Strand Hotel at famoushotels.org

Buildings and structures in Yangon
Resorts in Myanmar
Hotels in Myanmar
The Leading Hotels of the World
Hotels established in 1901
Hotel buildings completed in 1901